Chariessa elegans is a species of checkered beetles in the subfamily Peloniinae. It is found in the United States.

References

External links 

 Chariessa elegans at bugguide.net

Cleridae
Beetles described in 1870
Taxa named by George Henry Horn
Insects of the United States